In a writing career spanning 53 years (1939–1992), science fiction and popular science author Isaac Asimov (1920–1992) wrote and published 40 novels, 383 short stories, over 280 non-fiction books, and edited about 147 others.

In this article, Asimov's books are listed by year (in order of publication within a year, where known) with publisher indicated. They are divided between original works and edited books. Works of fiction are denoted by an asterisk (*) and books for children or adolescents by a dagger (†). Currently, 504 total books are listed here (357 original and 147 edited or annotated by Asimov).

Original book-length works

1950
Pebble in the Sky* (Doubleday)
I, Robot* (Gnome Press)

1951
The Stars, Like Dust-- * (Doubleday)
Foundation* (Gnome Press)

1952
David Starr, Space Ranger*† (Doubleday)
Foundation and Empire* (Gnome Press)
The Currents of Space* (Doubleday)
Biochemistry and Human Metabolism (Williams & Wilkins)

1953

Second Foundation* (Gnome Press)
Lucky Starr and the Pirates of the Asteroids*† (Doubleday)

1954
The Caves of Steel* (Doubleday)
Lucky Starr and the Oceans of Venus*† (Doubleday)
The Chemicals of Life: Enzymes, Vitamins, and Hormones (Abelard-Schuman)

1955
The End of Eternity* (Doubleday)
The Martian Way and Other Stories* (Doubleday)
Races and People (Abelard-Schuman); co-written with William C. Boyd, illustrations by John Bradford

1956
Lucky Starr and the Big Sun of Mercury*† (Doubleday)
Chemistry and Human Health (McGraw-Hill)
Inside the Atom (Abelard-Schuman)

1957
The Naked Sun* (Doubleday)
Lucky Starr and the Moons of Jupiter*† (Doubleday)
Building Blocks of the Universe (Abelard-Schuman)
Earth Is Room Enough: Science Fiction: Tales of Our Own Planet* (Doubleday)
Only a Trillion (Abelard-Schuman)

1958
The World of Carbon (Abelard-Schuman)
Lucky Starr and the Rings of Saturn*† (Doubleday) 
The World of Nitrogen (Abelard-Schuman)
The Death Dealers* (Avon)
Republished as A Whiff of Death (19??)

1959
Nine Tomorrows: Tales of the Near Future* (Doubleday)
The Clock We Live On (Abelard-Schuman)
Words of Science, and the History Behind Them† (Houghton Mifflin)
Realm of Numbers (Houghton Mifflin)
Breakthroughs in Science (Houghton Mifflin)

1960
The Living River (Abelard-Schuman)
The Kingdom of the Sun (Abelard-Schuman)
Realm of Measure (Houghton Mifflin)
Satellites in Outer Space (Random House)
The Wellsprings of Life (Abelard-Schuman)
The Intelligent Man's Guide to Science (Basic Books)
2nd edition: The New Intelligent Man's Guide to Science (1965; Basic Books)
3rd edition: Asimov's Guide to Science (1972; Basic Books)
4th edition: Asimov's New Guide to Science (1984; Basic Books) 
The Double Planet (Abelard-Schuman)

1961
Realm of Algebra (Houghton Mifflin)
Words from the Myths† (Houghton Mifflin)

1962
Life and Energy (Doubleday) 
Words in Genesis† (Houghton Mifflin; illustrations by William Barss)
Fact and Fancy (Doubleday)
Words on the Map† (Houghton Mifflin)
The Search for the Elements (Basic Books)

1963
Words from the Exodus†  (Houghton Mifflin; illustrations by William Barss)
The Genetic Code (Orion Press)
The Human Body: Its Structure and Operation (Houghton Mifflin; illustrations by Anthony Ravielli)
Revised/expanded edition, 1992
View from a Height (Doubleday)
The Kite That Won the Revolution† (Houghton Mifflin)

1964
The Human Brain: Its Capacities and Functions (Houghton Mifflin)
A Short History of Biology (Natural History Press) 
Quick and Easy Math (Houghton Mifflin)
Adding a Dimension (Doubleday)
Planets for Man (Random House), with Stephen H. Dole
The Rest of the Robots* (Doubleday)
Asimov's Biographical Encyclopedia of Science and Technology (Doubleday)
2nd edition, 1972
3rd edition, 1983

1965
A Short History of Chemistry (Doubleday)
The Greeks: A Great Adventure† (Houghton Mifflin)
Of Time and Space and Other Things (Doubleday)
An Easy Introduction to the Slide Rule (Houghton Mifflin)

1966
Fantastic Voyage* (Houghton Mifflin)The Noble Gases (Basic Books)The Neutrino: Ghost Particle of the Atom (Doubleday)The Roman Republic (Houghton Mifflin)Understanding Physics, 3 volumes (Walker)
Vol. I: Motion, Sound, and HeatVol. II: Light, Magnetism, and ElectricityVol. III: The Electron, Proton, and NeutronThe Genetic Effects of Radiation  (U.S. AEC)The Universe: From Flat Earth to Quasar (Walker)
2nd edition (1971; Walker)
3rd edition (1980), as The Universe: From Flat Earth to Black Holes and Beyond (Walker)From Earth to Heaven (Doubleday)

1967The Moon (Follet)Environments Out There (Scholastic/Abelard-Schuman)The Roman Empire (Houghton Mifflin)Through a Glass, Clearly* (New English Library)Is Anyone There? (Doubleday)To the Ends of the Universe (Walker)Mars (Follet)The Egyptians (Houghton Mifflin)

1968Asimov's Mysteries* (Doubleday)Science, Numbers, and I (Doubleday)Stars (Follet)Galaxies (Follet)The Near East: 10,000 Years of History (Houghton Mifflin)The Dark Ages (Houghton Mifflin)Asimov's Guide to the Bible, Volume I (Doubleday)Words from History† (Houghton Mifflin)

1969Photosynthesis  (Basic Books)The Shaping of England (Houghton Mifflin)Twentieth Century Discovery (Doubleday)Nightfall and Other Stories* (Doubleday)Asimov's Guide to the Bible, Volume II (Doubleday)Opus 100 (Houghton Mifflin)ABC's of Space† (Walker)Great Ideas of Science (Houghton Mifflin)

1970The Solar System and Back (Doubleday)Asimov's Guide to Shakespeare, 2 volumes (Doubleday)Constantinople: The Forgotten Empire (Houghton Mifflin)ABC's of the Ocean† (Walker)Light (Follet)

1971The Stars in Their Courses (Doubleday)What Makes the Sun Shine? (Little, Brown & Co.)The Best New Thing*† (World Pub. Co.)The Land of Canaan (Houghton Mifflin)ABC's of the Earth† (Walker)The Sensuous Dirty Old Man (as by Dr. "A.") (Walker)Isaac Asimov's Treasury of Humor (Houghton Mifflin)

1972The Left Hand of the Electron (Doubleday)The Gods Themselves* (Doubleday)More Words of Science† (Houghton Mifflin)Electricity and Man (U.S. AEC)ABC's of Ecology† (Walker)The Early Asimov or, Eleven Years of Trying* (Doubleday)The Shaping of France (Houghton Mifflin)The Story of Ruth† (Doubleday)Ginn Science Program, Intermediate Level A† (Ginn)Ginn Science Program, Intermediate Level C† (Ginn) Worlds Within Worlds (U.S. AEC)Ginn Science Program, Intermediate Level B† (Ginn)

1973How Did We Find Out the Earth Is Round? † (Walker)Comets and Meteors (Follet)The Sun (Follet)How Did We Find Out About Electricity? † (Walker)The Shaping of North America: From Earliest Times to 1763 (Houghton Mifflin) Today and Tomorrow and ... (Doubleday)Jupiter, the Largest Planet (Lothrop, Lee, & Shepard)Ginn Science Program, Advanced Level A† (Ginn)Ginn Science Program, Advanced Level B† (Ginn)How Did We Find Out About Numbers? † (Walker)Please Explain (Houghton Mifflin)The Tragedy of the Moon (Abelard-Schuman)How Did We Find Out About Dinosaurs? † (Walker)The Best of Isaac Asimov* (Sphere)

1974Asimov on Astronomy (Doubleday)The Birth of the United States: 1763-1816 (Houghton Mifflin) Have You Seen These?* (NESRAA) Our World in Space (New York Graphic Society) How Did We Find Out About Germs? † (Walker) Tales of the Black Widowers* (Doubleday) Earth: Our Crowded Spaceship (John Day) Asimov on Chemistry (Doubleday) How Did We Find Out About Vitamins?† (Walker)

1975Of Matters Great and Small (Doubleday) The Solar System (Follet) Our Federal Union: The United States from 1816 to 1865 (Houghton Mifflin) How Did We Find Out About Comets?† (Walker)Science Past, Science Future (Doubleday) Buy Jupiter and Other Stories* (Doubleday) Eyes on the Universe: A History of the Telescope (Houghton Mifflin) Lecherous Limericks (Walker) The Heavenly Host*† (Walker); illustrations by Bernard ColonnaThe Ends of the Earth: The Polar Regions of the World (Weybright & Talley)How Did We Find Out About Energy?† (Walker; Series: How Did We Find Out Series)

1976 ‘The Dream’, ‘Benjamin's Dream’ & ‘Benjamin's Bicentennial Blast’* (Benjamin Franklin Keeps) Asimov on Physics (Doubleday)Murder at the ABA* (Doubleday)
Republished as Authorized Murder (19??) How Did We Find Out About Atoms? † (Walker)Good Taste* (Apocalypse Press)The Planet That Wasn't (Doubleday)The Bicentennial Man and Other Stories* (Doubleday)More Lecherous Limericks (Walker)More Tales of the Black Widowers* (Doubleday/Crime Club)Alpha Centauri, the Nearest Star (Lothrop, Lee, & Shepard)How Did We Find Out About Nuclear Power?† (Walker)

1977The Collapsing Universe: The Story of Black Holes (Walker) Asimov on Numbers (Doubleday)How Did We Find Out About Outer Space?† (Walker)Still More Lecherous Limericks (Walker)The Beginning and the End (Doubleday)Mars, the Red Planet (Lothrop, Lee, & Shepard)The Golden Door: The United States from 1865 to 1918 (Houghton Mifflin)The Key Word and Other Mysteries* (Walker)Asimov's Sherlockian Limericks (Mysterious)

1978Quasar, Quasar, Burning Bright (Doubleday)How Did We Find Out About Earthquakes? † (Walker)Animals of the Bible† (Doubleday)Limericks: Too Gross; or Two Dozen Dirty Stanzas (W. W. Norton)How Did We Find Out About Black Holes? † (Walker)Life and Time (Doubleday)

1979Saturn and Beyond (Lothrop, Lee, & Shepard)Opus 200 (Houghton Mifflin)In Memory Yet Green: The Autobiography of Isaac Asimov, 1920–1954 (Doubleday)Extraterrestrial Civilizations (Crown)How Did We Find Out About Our Human Roots? † (Walker)The Road to Infinity (Doubleday)A Choice of Catastrophes (Simon & Schuster)Isaac Asimov's Book of Facts (Grosset & Dunlap)How Did We Find Out About Antarctica?† (Walker)The Threats of Our World1980Casebook of the Black Widowers*  (Doubleday)How Did We Find Out About Oil?† (Walker)In Joy Still Felt: The Autobiography of Isaac Asimov, 1954–1978 (Doubleday)How Did We Find Out About Coal?† (Walker)

1981In the Beginning: Science Faces God in the Book of Genesis  (Crown/Stonesong Press)Asimov on Science Fiction (Doubleday)Venus, Near Neighbor of the Sun (Lothrop, Lee, & Shepard)Three by Asimov* (Targ)How Did We Find Out About Solar Power?† (Walker)How Did We Find Out About Volcanoes?† (Walker)Visions of the Universe (The Cosmos Store); co-written with Kazuaki Iwasaki The Sun Shines Bright (Doubleday)Change! Seventy-one Glimpses of the Future (Houghton Mifflin)A Grossery of Limericks (W. W. Norton)

1982How Did We Find Out About Life in the Deep Sea?† (Walker)The Complete Robot* (Doubleday)Exploring the Earth and the Cosmos (Crown)How Did We Find Out About the Beginning of Life?† (Walker)Isaac Asimov Presents Superquiz (Dembner Books)Foundation's Edge* (Doubleday)How Did We Find Out About the Universe?† (Walker)

1983Counting the Eons (Doubleday)The Winds of Change and Other Stories* (Doubleday)The Roving Mind (Prometheus Books)The Measure of the Universe (Harper & Row)The Union Club Mysteries* (Doubleday)Norby, the Mixed-up Robot*† (Walker)The Robots of Dawn* (Doubleday)How Did We Find Out About Genes?† (Walker)Isaac Asimov Presents Superquiz II ( Dembner Books)

1984X Stands for Unknown (Doubleday)Norby's Other Secret*†  (Walker)How Did We Find Out About Computers?† (Walker)Opus 300 (Houghton Mifflin)Banquets of the Black Widowers* (Doubleday)Isaac Asimov's Limericks for Children† (Caedmon)How Did We Find Out About Robots?  † (Walker)

1985Asimov's Guide to Halley's Comet (Walker)The Exploding Suns: The Secrets of the Supernovas (E. P. Dutton) Norby and the Lost Princess*† (Walker)How Did We Find Out About the Atmosphere?† (Walker)Living in the Future (Harmony House)Robots: Machines In Man's Image (Harmony House)The Edge of Tomorrow* (Tor/Tom Doherty Associates)  The Subatomic Monster (Doubleday)The Disappearing Man and Other Mysteries* (Walker)Robots and Empire* (Doubleday)Norby and the Invaders*† (Walker)It's Such a Beautiful Day* (Creative Education)How Did We Find Out About DNA?† (Walker)

1986The Dangers of Intelligence and Other Science Essays (Houghton Mifflin)The Alternate Asimovs* (Doubleday)How Did We Find Out About the Speed of Light?† (Walker)Futuredays: A Nineteenth-Century Vision of the Year 2000 (Henry Holt)Science Fiction by Asimov* (Davis Publications) The Best Science Fiction of Isaac Asimov* (Doubleday)The Best Mysteries of Isaac Asimov* (Doubleday)Foundation and Earth* (Doubleday)Robot Dreams* (Byron Preiss)Norby and the Queen's Necklace*† (Walker)

1987Far as Human Eye Could See: Essays on Science (Doubleday)How Did We Find Out About Blood?† (Walker) Past, Present, and Future (Prometheus Books)Isaac Asimov Presents Superquiz III (Dembner Books)How Did We Find Out About Sunshine?  † (Walker)How to Enjoy Writing: A Book of Aid and Comfort (Walker)Norby Finds a Villain*† (Walker)Fantastic Voyage II: Destination Brain* (Doubleday)How Did We Find Out About the Brain?† (Walker)Did Comets Kill the Dinosaurs?† (Gareth Stevens, Inc)Beginnings: The Story of Origins of Mankind, Life, the Earth, the Universe (Walker)Other Worlds of Isaac Asimov* (Avenel)

1988How Did We Find Out About Superconductivity?† (Walker)The Relativity of Wrong (Doubleday)Prelude to Foundation* (Doubleday)The Asteroids† (Gareth Stevens, Inc)The Earth's Moon† (Gareth Stevens, Inc)Mars: Our Mysterious Neighbor† (Gareth Stevens, Inc)Our Milky Way and Other Galaxies† (Gareth Stevens, Inc)Quasars, Pulsars, and Black Holes† (Gareth Stevens, Inc)Rockets, Probes, and Satellites† (Gareth Stevens, Inc)Our Solar System† (Gareth Stevens, Inc)The Sun† (Gareth Stevens, Inc)Uranus: The Sideways Planet† (Gareth Stevens, Inc) History of Biology [A chart] (Carolina Biological Suppls.) Azazel* (Doubleday)Isaac Asimov's Science Fiction and Fantasy Story-a-Month 1989 Calendar (Pomegranate Calendars & Bks) Saturn: The Ringed Beauty† (Gareth Stevens, Inc)How Was the Universe Born?† (Gareth Stevens, Inc)Earth: Our Home Base† (Gareth Stevens, Inc)Ancient Astronomy† (Gareth Stevens, Inc)Unidentified Flying Objects† (Gareth Stevens, Inc; Series: Isaac Asimov's Library of the Universe)The Space Spotter's Guide† (Gareth Stevens, Inc)Norby Down to Earth*† (Walker)

1989How Did We Find Out About Microwaves?† (Walker)Asimov's Galaxy: Reflections on Science Fiction (Doubleday)All the Troubles of the World* (Creative Education)Franchise*  (Creative Education)Robbie* (Creative Education)Sally* (Creative Education)Is There Life on Other Planets?† (Gareth Stevens, Inc)Science Fiction, Science Fact† (Gareth Stevens, Inc)Mercury: The Quick Planet† (Gareth Stevens, Inc)Space Garbage† (Gareth Stevens, Inc)Jupiter: The Spotted Giant†  (Gareth Stevens, Inc)The Birth and Death of Stars† (Gareth Stevens, Inc)The Asimov Chronicles: Fifty Years of Isaac Asimov* (Dark Harvest) The History of Mathematics [a chart] (Carolina Biological Suppls.)Think About Space: Where Have We Been and Where Are We Going? (Walker; Series: The Think Series), with Frank WhiteIsaac Asimov Presents Superquiz IV (Dembner Books)The Tyrannosaurus Prescription: and One Hundred Other Science Essays (Prometheus Books) Asimov on Science: A 30 Year Retrospective 1959–1989 (Doubleday) Nemesis* (Doubleday) Asimov's Chronology of Science and Discovery (Harper & Row) How Did We Find Out About Photosynthesis?† (Walker)The Complete Science Fair Handbooks  (Scott Foresman & Co)Little Treasury of Dinosaurs† (5 book set) (Outlet)Giant Dinosaurs†  Armored Dinosaurs†  Small Dinosaurs†  Sea Reptiles and Flying Reptiles†Meat-Eating Dinosaurs and Horned Dinosaurs†  Norby and Yobo's Great Adventure*† (Walker)Mythology and the Universe† (Gareth Stevens, Inc)Colonizing the Planets and the Stars† (Gareth Stevens, Inc)Astronomy Today† (Gareth Stevens, Inc)Pluto: A Double Planet?† (Gareth Stevens, Inc)Piloted Space Flights† (Gareth Stevens, Inc)Comets and Meteors† (Gareth Stevens, Inc)

1990Puzzles of the Black Widowers* (Doubleday)Norby and the Oldest Dragon*†  (Walker)Frontiers: New Discoveries About Man and His Planet, Outer Space and the Universe (E. P. Dutton/Truman)Out of the Everywhere: Thoughts on Science from the Master (Doubleday)Robot Visions* (Byron Preiss)How Did We Find Out About Lasers?† (Walker)Neptune: The Farthest Giant† (Gareth Stevens, Inc; Series: Isaac Asimov's Library of the Universe)Venus: A Shrouded Mystery† (Gareth Stevens, Inc; Series: Isaac Asimov's Library of the Universe)The World's Space Programs† (Gareth Stevens, Inc; Series: Isaac Asimov's Library of the Universe)Nightfall*  (Doubleday); co-written with Robert SilverbergThe Complete Stories Volume 1* (Doubleday)How Did We Find Out About Neptune?† (Walker)The March of the Millennia: A Key to Looking at History (Walker), with Frank WhiteCal: A Short Story Written Exclusively for Members of the Isaac Asimov Collection* (Doubleday)

1991Norby and the Court Jester*† (Walker)The March of the Millennia: A Key to Looking at History (Walker)The Secret of the Universe (Doubleday) How Did We Find Out About Pluto? † (Walker)Atom: Journey Across the Subatomic Cosmos (E. P. Dutton/Truman)Our Angry Earth: A Ticking Ecological Bomb (Tor); co-written with Frederik Pohl (2018 edition includes intro/afterword by Kim Stanley Robinson)Why Do We Have Different Seasons?† (Gareth Stevens, Inc)Is Our Planet Warming Up?  † (Gareth Stevens, Inc)Why Is the Air Dirty? † (Gareth Stevens, Inc)Why Are Whales Vanishing?† (Gareth Stevens, Inc)Where Does Garbage Go? † (Gareth Stevens, Inc; Series: Ask Isaac Asimov)What Causes Acid Rain? † (Gareth Stevens, Inc)What Is a Shooting Star?† (Gareth Stevens, Inc)Why Do Stars Twinkle?† (Gareth Stevens, Inc)Why Does the Moon Change Shape?† (Gareth Stevens, Inc)What Is an Eclipse?† (Gareth Stevens, Inc)Isaac Asimov's Guide to Earth and Space (Random House)Asimov's Chronology of the World (HarperCollins)Christopher Columbus: Navigator to the New World† (Gareth Stevens, Inc; Series: Isaac Asimov's Pioneers of Science and Exploration)Ferdinand Magellan: Opening the Door to World Exploration† (Gareth Stevens, Inc; Series: Isaac Asimov's Pioneers of Science and Exploration)The History of Chemistry [a chart]

1992The Ugly Little Boy* (Doubleday); co-written with Robert SilverbergThe Complete Stories, Volume 2* (Doubleday)Why Are Some Beaches Oily?† (Gareth Stevens, Inc)Why Are Animals Endangered?† (Gareth Stevens, Inc; Series: Ask Isaac Asimov)Why Are the Rain Forests Vanishing? † (Gareth Stevens, Inc)Why Does Litter Cause Problems?† (Gareth Stevens, Inc)Asimov Laughs Again: More Than 700 Favorite Jokes, Limericks, and Anecdotes (HarperCollins)What's Happening to the Ozone Layer? † (Gareth Stevens, Inc)

1993Forward the Foundation* (Doubleday)The Positronic Man*  (Doubleday); co-written with Robert SilverbergThe Future in Space† (Gareth Stevens, Inc; Series: Isaac Asimov's Library of the Universe), with Greg Walz-ChojnackiFrontiers II: More Recent Discoveries About Life, Earth, Space, and the Universe (E. P. Dutton/Truman), with Janet Asimov

1994I. Asimov: A Memoir (Doubleday)

1995Gold: The Final Science Fiction Collection* (HarperPrism)Yours, Isaac Asimov (Doubleday)

1996Magic: The Final Fantasy Collection* (HarperPrism)

2002It's Been a Good Life, condensation of three autobiographical volumes edited by Asimov's widow

2003The Return of the Black Widowers*

As editor or annotator

1962The Hugo Winners* (Doubleday)

1963Fifty Short Science Fiction Tales* (Collier)

1966Tomorrow's Children: Eighteen Tales of Fantasy and Science Fiction* (Doubleday)

1971Where Do We Go from Here? * (Doubleday)The Hugo Winners, Volume II* (Doubleday)

1972Asimov's Annotated ‘Don Juan’ (Doubleday)

1973Nebula Award Stories Eight* (Harper & Row)

1974Before the Golden Age: A Science Fiction Anthology of the 1930s* (Doubleday) Asimov's Annotated ‘Paradise Lost’ (Doubleday)

1977Familiar Poems, Annotated (Doubleday)The Hugo Winners, Volume III* (Doubleday)

1978One Hundred Great Science Fiction Short-Short Stories* (Doubleday)

1979Isaac Asimov Presents The Great SF Stories 1 (1939)* (DAW Books)Isaac Asimov Presents The Great SF Stories 2 (1940)* (DAW Books)The Science Fictional Solar System* (Harper & Row)The Thirteen Crimes of Science Fiction* (Doubleday)1979

1980The Future in Question* (Fawcett Crest)Isaac Asimov Presents The Great SF Stories 3 (1941)* (DAW Books)Who Done It?  * (Houghton Mifflin)Space Mail* (Fawcett Crest)Microcosmic Tales: 100 Wondrous Science Fiction Short-Short Stories* (Taplinger)Isaac Asimov Presents The Great SF Stories 4 (1942)* (DAW Books)The Seven Deadly Sins of Science Fiction* (Fawcett Crest)The Annotated ‘Gulliver's Travels’ (Clarkson N. Potter)

1981The Future I* (Fawcett Crest)Isaac Asimov Presents The Great SF Stories 5 (1943)* (DAW Books)Catastrophes!* (Fawcett Crest)Isaac Asimov Presents the Best Science Fiction of the 19th Century* (Beaufort Books)The Seven Cardinal Virtues of Science Fiction* (Fawcett Crest)Fantastic Creatures: An Anthology of Fantasy and Science Fiction* (Franklin Watts) Raintree Reading Series I* (Raintree)Travels Through Time*Thinking Machines*Wild Inventions*After The End*Miniature Mysteries: One Hundred Malicious Little Mystery Stories* (Taplinger)The Twelve Crimes of Christmas* (Avon)Isaac Asimov Presents The Great SF Stories 6 (1944)* (DAW Books)

1982Space Mail, Volume II* (Fawcett Crest)Tantalizing Locked Room Mysteries* (Walker)TV: 2000* (Fawcett Crest)Laughing Space* (Houghton Mifflin)Speculations* (Houghton Mifflin)Flying Saucers* (Fawcett Crest)Raintree Reading Series II* (Raintree)Earth Invaded*Mad Scientists*Mutants*Tomorrow's TV*Dragon Tales* (Fawcett Crest)The Big Apple Mysteries* (Avon)Isaac Asimov Presents The Great SF Stories 7 (1945)* (DAW Books)The Last Man on Earth* (Fawcett Crest)Science Fiction A to Z: A Dictionary of Great Science Fiction Themes* (Houghton Mifflin)Isaac Asimov Presents the Best Fantasy of the 19th Century* (Beaufort Books)Isaac Asimov Presents The Great SF Stories 8 (1946)* (DAW Books)Isaac Asimov Presents The Great SF Stories 9 (1947)* (DAW Books)

1983Show Business Is Murder* (Avon)Hallucination Orbit: Psychology In Science Fiction* (Farrar, Straus, & Giroux), with Charles G. Waugh and Martin Harry GreenbergCaught In the Organ Draft: Biology in Science Fiction* (Farrar, Straus, & Giroux) The Science Fiction Weight-Loss Book* (Crown)Isaac Asimov Presents the Best Horror and Supernatural Stories of the 19th Century* (Beaufort Books)Starships: Stories Beyond the Boundaries of the Universe* (Fawcett Crest)Isaac Asimov Presents The Great SF Stories 10 (1948)* (DAW Books)Thirteen Horrors of Halloween* (Avon)Creations: The Quest for Origins in Story and Science* (Crown)Wizards* (NAL)Those Amazing Electronic Thinking Machines! An Anthology of Robot and Computer Stories* (Franklin Watts)Computer Crimes and Capers* (Academy Chicago Pub.) Intergalactic Empires* (NAL)Machines That Think: The Best Science Stories About Robots and Computers* (Holt, Rinehart, & Winston)

1984One Hundred Great Fantasy Short-Short Stories* (Doubleday)Raintree Reading Series 3* (Raintree)Bug Awful*Children Of The Future*The Immortals*Time Warps*Isaac Asimov Presents The Great SF Stories 11 (1949)* (DAW Books)Witches* (NAL)Murder on the Menu* (Avon)Young Mutants* (Harper & Row)Isaac Asimov Presents the Best Science Fiction Firsts* (Beaufort Books)The Science Fictional Olympics* (NAL)Fantastic Reading: Stories & Activities for Grade 5–8* (Scott Foresman & Co.)Election Day 2084: Science Fiction Stories on the Politics of the Future* (Prometheus Books)Isaac Asimov Presents The Great SF Stories 12 (1950) (DAW Books)Young Extraterrestrials* (Harper & Row)Sherlock Holmes Through Time and Space* (Bluejay Books)Supermen* (NAL)Baker's Dozen: 13 Short Fantasy Novels* (Crown)

1985Cosmic Knights* (NAL)The Hugo Winners, Volume IV* (Doubleday)Young Monsters* (Harper & Row)Spells* (NAL)Great Science Fiction Stories by the World's Great Scientists* (Donald I. Fine)Isaac Asimov Presents The Great SF Stories 13 (1951)* (DAW Books)Amazing Stories: Sixty Years of the Best Science Fiction* (TSR, Inc.)Young Ghosts* (Harper & Row)Baker's Dozen: Thirteen Short Science Fiction Novels* (Crown)Giants* (NAL)

1986Isaac Asimov Presents The Great SF Stories 14 (1952)* (DAW Books)Comets* (NAL)Young Star Travelers* (Harper & Row)The Hugo Winners, Volume V* (Doubleday)Mythical Beasties* (NAL)Tin Stars* (NAL)Magical Wishes* (NAL)Isaac Asimov Presents The Great SF Stories 15 (1953)* (DAW Books)The Twelve Frights of Christmas* (Avon)

1987Isaac Asimov Presents The Great SF Stories 16 (1954)* (DAW Books)Young Witches and Warlocks* (Harper & Row)Devils* (NAL)Hound Dunnit* (Carroll & Graf)Space Shuttles* (NAL)

1988Isaac Asimov's Book of Science and Nature Quotations (Blue Cliff) Atlantis* (NAL)Isaac Asimov Presents The Great SF Stories 17 (1955)* (DAW Books)Asimov's Annotated Gilbert and Sullivan (Doubleday)Encounters* (Headline)Isaac Asimov Presents the Best Crime Stories of the 19th Century* (Dembner Books)The Mammoth Book of Classic Science Fiction: Short Novels of the 1930s* (Carroll & Graf)Monsters* (NAL)Isaac Asimov Presents The Great SF Stories 18 (1956)* (DAW Books)Ghosts* (NAL)The Sport of Crime* (Lynx)

1989Isaac Asimov Presents The Great SF Stories 19 (1957)* (DAW Books)Isaac Asimov Presents Tales of the Occult* (Prometheus Books)Purr-fect Crime* (Lynx)Robots* (NAL)Visions of Fantasy: Tales from the Masters* (Doubleday)Curses (NAL)The New Hugo Winners* (Wynwood Press)Senior Sleuths: A Large Print Anthology of Mysteries and Puzzlers* (G. K. Hall & Co.) The Mammoth Book of Golden Age Science Fiction: Short Novels of the 1940s* (Carroll & Graf)

1990Cosmic Critiques: How & Why Ten Science Fiction Stories Work* (Writer's Digest Books)  Isaac Asimov Presents The Great SF Stories 20 (1958)* (DAW Books)Isaac Asimov Presents The Great SF Stories 21 (1959)* (DAW Books)Robots from Asimov's* (Davis Publications)Invasions* (Roc/Penguin Books)The Mammoth Book of Vintage Science Fiction: Short Novels of the 1950s* (Carroll & Graf)

1991Isaac Asimov Presents The Great SF Stories 22 (1960)* (DAW Books)Isaac Asimov Presents The Great SF Stories 23 (1961)* (DAW Books)Faeries (Roc/Penguin Books)The Mammoth Book of New World Science Fiction: Short Novels of the 1960s* (Carroll & Graf)

1992Isaac Asimov Presents The Great SF Stories 24 (1962)* (DAW Books)The New Hugo Winners, Volume II* (Baen Books)Isaac Asimov Presents The Great SF Stories 25 (1963)* (DAW Books)The Mammoth Book of Fantastic Science Fiction: Short Novels of the 1970s* (Carroll & Graf)

1993The Mammoth Book of Modern Science Fiction: Short Novels of the 1980s* (Carroll & Graf)

Books with introduction by Asimov
Boardman, Barrington (1989), Flappers, Bootleggers, "Typhoid Mary" and the Bomb: An Anecdotal History of the U.S. from 1923-1945 (Harpercollins)
Reissued in 1992 as Isaac Asimov Presents From Harding to Hiroshima: An Anecdotal History of the United States from 1923 to 1945'' (Dembner Books)

Short stories

See also
 Isaac Asimov bibliography (categorical)
 Isaac Asimov bibliography (alphabetical)

Notes

External links
 Asimov Online
 
 The Fiction of Isaac Asimov - Part I and Part II at The Internet Time Travel Database
 Jenkins’ Spoiler-Laden Guide to Isaac Asimov
 

 
Bibliographies by writer
Bibliographies of American writers
Science fiction bibliographies